Ypreville-Biville is a commune in the Seine-Maritime department in the Normandy region in northern France.

Geography

Population

Places of interest
 The church of St. Michel, dating from the seventeenth century.
 The chateau de Biville.
 Ruins of an eleventh-century chapel at Biville.
 Fourteenth-century tombs in the cemetery.

See also
Communes of the Seine-Maritime department

References

External links

Communes of Seine-Maritime